Majestik Zouk is an album by the French Caribbean music group Kassav'. It was released in 1989 by Columbia Records in the United States, and internationally by CBS Records International.

Critical reception
The New York Times wrote that "the accompaniment flits from calypso on synthesizers to abbreviated horn riffs over a tangle of African percussion." The Washington Post wrote that "the grooves are established by the locked-together, pause-and-push rhythms of guitarist Jacob Desvarieux and bassist Georges Decimus." The Gazette opined that "if you can get past the programmed drums, you'll be thrilled by the rhythms, uplifted by the brass ... and charmed by the classy singing."

Track listing
"'Se Dam' Bonjou (Good Morning Ladies and Gentlemen)"
"Djoni (Johnny)"
"Wép (Hey)"
"Raché Tche (Sorrow)"
"Ou Lé (Would You Like)"
"Dézodiè (Unstable)"
"Konkibin (Concubine)"
"Doméyis (Domeus)"
"An Mwé (Help!)"
"Apré Zouk La (After Zouk)"

References

1989 albums
Zouk